Jonathan Charles Toogood (born in Wellington, New Zealand, on 9 August 1971) is the frontman (lead vocals and guitar) of the New Zealand rock band Shihad. He formed the band in 1988 with fellow Wellingtonian Tom Larkin. Toogood and Larkin met as teenage fans of AC/DC and Metallica.

Solo work

In 2009 Toogood revealed he had been travelling around New Zealand to collaborate with other New Zealand artists for a project that is "extra-curricular" to Shihad's music. Confirmed collaborators included Tiki Taane, Ruban and Kody Neilson from the Mint Chicks, Julia Deans from Fur Patrol, Anika Moa, Shayne Carter of Dimmer/Straitjacket Fits fame and Ladi 6. "The Adults" was released as a full-length album in New Zealand in June 2011. Toogood subsequently toured NZ and Australia under this banner, joined onstage by Deans and Carter.

In 2020 Toogood was inducted into Massey University's College of Creative Arts' hall of fame.

Personal life

Toogood is not related to the broadcasting icon Selwyn Toogood, as his parents migrated from England to New Zealand in the 1950s. Toogood was a keen cricket player in high school, and at one stage captained the Wellington secondary schools' representative cricket team.

As of April 2005, Toogood was married to Ronise Paul, with whom he had a stepdaughter named Anaya. Toogood married Dana Salih, who is a Sudanese Muslim, in Sudan in 2014. Toogood had converted to Islam prior to the wedding.

Awards

Aotearoa Music Awards
The Aotearoa Music Awards (previously known as New Zealand Music Awards (NZMA)) are an annual awards night celebrating excellence in New Zealand music and have been presented annually since 1965.

! 
|-
| 1992 || Jon Toogood - Shihad || Most Promising Male ||   ||rowspan="8"| 
|-
| 1994 || Jon Toogood - Shihad || Male Vocalist of the Year||  
|-
| 1996 || Jon Toogood - Shihad || Male Vocalist of the Year||  
|-
|rowspan="2"| 1997 || Karl Kippenberger & Jon Toogood for Shihad || Album Cover of the Year ||  
|-
| Jon Toogood - Shihad || Male Vocalist of the Year||  
|-
| 1998 || Jon Toogood - Shihad || Male Vocalist of the Year||  
|-
| 2000 || Jon Toogood - Shihad || Male Vocalist of the Year||  
|-
| 2001 || Jon Toogood - Shihad || Male Vocalist of the Year||  
|-
| 2010 || Jon Toogood (as part of Shihad) || New Zealand Music Hall of Fame ||  || 
|-

References

External links

Shihad's Official Site
The Adults Official Site

1971 births
APRA Award winners
Converts to Islam
Living people
New Zealand Muslims
Musicians from Wellington
New Zealand songwriters
Male songwriters
New Zealand guitarists
New Zealand male guitarists
People educated at Wellington High School, New Zealand
21st-century guitarists
21st-century male musicians
The Adults members
Shihad members